Respiratory syncytial virus (RSV), also called human respiratory syncytial virus (hRSV) and human orthopneumovirus, is a common, contagious virus that causes infections of the respiratory tract. It is a negative-sense, single-stranded RNA virus. Its name is derived from the large cells known as syncytia that form when infected cells fuse.

RSV is the single most common cause of respiratory hospitalization in infants, and reinfection remains common in later life: it is a notable pathogen in all age groups. Infection rates are typically higher during the cold winter months, causing bronchiolitis in infants, common colds in adults, and more serious respiratory illnesses such as pneumonia in the elderly and immunocompromised.

RSV can cause outbreaks both in the community and in hospital settings. Following initial infection via the eyes or nose, the virus infects the epithelial cells of the upper and lower airway, causing inflammation, cell damage, and airway obstruction. A variety of methods are available for viral detection and diagnosis of RSV including antigen testing, molecular testing, and viral culture. The main prevention measures include hand-washing and avoiding close contact with infected individuals; prophylactic use of palivizumab is also available to prevent RSV infection in high-risk infants. Currently, there is no vaccine against RSV, although many are under development.

Treatment for severe illness is primarily supportive, including oxygen therapy and more advanced breathing support with CPAP or nasal high flow oxygen, as required. In cases of severe respiratory failure, intubation and mechanical ventilation may be required. Ribavirin is the only antiviral medication currently licensed for the treatment of RSV in children, although its use remains controversial.

History
RSV was first discovered in 1956 when researchers isolated a virus from a population of chimpanzees with respiratory illness. They named the virus CCA (Chimpanzee Coryza Agent). In 1957, this same virus was identified by Robert M. Chanock in children with respiratory illness. Studies of human antibodies in infants and children revealed that the infection was common in early life. The virus was later renamed human orthopneumovirus, or human respiratory syncytial virus (hRSV).

Several other pneumoviruses exist that show great similarity to hRSV. Most notable of these is bovine RSV (bRSV), which shares approximately 80% of its genome with hRSV. It also shares hRSV's predilection for the young, causing more severe disease in calves less than 6 months old. Because bRSV-infected calves have an almost identical presentation to hRSV-infected children, this has proven to be an important animal model in RSV research.

Signs and symptoms
RSV infection can present with a wide variety of signs and symptoms that range from mild upper respiratory tract infections (URTI) to severe and potentially life-threatening lower respiratory tract infections (LRTI) requiring hospitalization and mechanical ventilation. While RSV can cause respiratory tract infections in people of all ages and is among the most common childhood infections, its presentation often varies between age groups and immune status. Reinfection is common throughout life, but infants and the elderly remain at highest risk for symptomatic infection.

Children
Most children will experience at least one RSV infection by age 2. Most childhood RSV infections are fairly self-limited with typical upper respiratory tract signs and symptoms, such as nasal congestion, runny nose, cough, and low-grade fever. Inflammation of the nasal mucosa (rhinitis) and throat (pharyngitis), as well as redness of the eyes (conjunctival infection), may be seen on exam. Approximately 15–50% of children will go on to develop more serious lower respiratory tracts infections, such as bronchiolitis, viral pneumonia, or croup. Infants are at the highest risk of disease progression.

Bronchiolitis is a common lower respiratory tract infection characterized by inflammation and obstruction of the small airways in the lungs. While several viruses can cause bronchiolitis, RSV is responsible for about 70% of cases. It usually presents with 2 to 4 days of runny nose and congestion followed by worsening cough, noisy breathing, tachypnea (fast breathing), and wheezing. As infants work harder to breathe, they can also show signs of respiratory distress, such as subcostal retractions (when the belly pulls under the ribcage), intercostal retractions (when the muscles between the ribs pull inward), grunting, and nasal flaring. If the child has not been able to feed adequately, signs of dehydration may also be present. Fever may be present, but high-grade fever is uncommon. Crackles and wheezing can often be heard on auscultation, and oxygen saturation levels may be decreased.

In very young infants under 6 weeks of age, and particularly in premature infants, signs of infection may be less specific. They may have minimal respiratory involvement. Instead, they may exhibit decreased activity, irritability, poor feeding, or breathing with difficulties. This can also be accompanied by apneic spells, or brief pauses in breathing.

Adults
Reinfection with RSV remains common throughout life. Reinfection in adulthood often produces only mild to moderate symptoms indistinguishable from the common cold or sinus infection. Infection may also be asymptomatic. If present, symptoms are generally isolated to the upper respiratory tract: runny nose, sore throat, fever, and malaise. In the vast majority of cases, nasal congestion precedes the development of cough. In contrast to other upper respiratory infections, RSV is also more likely to cause new onset wheeze in adults. Only about 25% of infected adults will progress to significant lower respiratory tract infection, such as bronchitis or tracheobronchitis.

While RSV very rarely causes severe disease in healthy adults, it can cause significant morbidity and mortality in the elderly and in those with underlying immune compromise or cardiopulmonary disease. Older adults have a similar presentation to younger adults but tend to have greater symptom severity with increased risk of lower respiratory tract involvement. In particular, the elderly are more likely to experience pneumonia, respiratory distress, and death.

Immunocompromised
In both adults and children, those who are immunocompromised are at an increased risk of severe infection with RSV. Infected individuals in this group are more likely to progress from upper to lower respiratory tract involvement and have prolonged viral shedding. Symptom severity seems to be closely related to the extent of immune suppression. Those who have undergone hematopoietic stem cell transplant (HSCT), intensive chemotherapy, and lung transplant are particularly susceptible. Bone marrow transplant patients appear to be at highest risk, especially prior to marrow engraftment. In this group, RSV infection carries a nearly 80% risk of both pneumonia and death.

Complications

Cause

Risk factors
Risk factors for development of severe lower respiratory tract infection with RSV vary by population.

Virology

Taxonomy
RSV is a negative-sense, single-stranded RNA virus. The scientific name for this viral species is Human orthopneumovirus. This is synonymous with Human respiratory syncytial virus (hRSV), which is often shortened to just RSV. It belongs to the genus Orthopneumovirus, family Pneumoviridae, order Mononegavirales. Its name comes from the fact that F proteins on the surface of the virus cause neighboring cell membranes to merge, creating large multinucleated syncytia.

Antigenic subtypes
RSV is divided into two antigenic subtypes, A and B, based on the reactivity of the F and G surface proteins to monoclonal antibodies. The subtypes tend to circulate simultaneously within local epidemics, although subtype A tends to be more prevalent. Generally, RSV subtype A (RSVA) is thought to be more virulent than RSV subtype B (RSVB), with higher viral loads and faster transmission time. To date, 16 RSVA and 22 RSVB clades have been identified. Among RSVA, the GA1, GA2, GA5, and GA7 clades predominate; GA7 is found only in the United States. Among RSVB, the BA clade predominates worldwide.

Genome

RSV has a negative-sense, single-stranded RNA genome. The genome is linear and approximately 15,000 nucleotides in length. It is non-segmented which means that, unlike influenza, RSV cannot participate in the type of genetic reassortment and antigenic shifts responsible for large pandemics. It has 10 genes encoding for 11 proteins. The gene order is NS1-NS2-N-P-M-SH-G-F-M2-L, with the NS1 and NS2 gene serving as nonstructural promoter genes.

Structure and proteins

RSV is a medium-sized (~150 nm) enveloped virus. While most particles are spherical, filamentous species have also been identified. The genome rests within a helical nucleocapsid and is surrounded by matrix protein and an envelope containing viral glycoproteins. There are 11 proteins, described further in the table below.

G protein

Surface protein G (glycoprotein) is primarily responsible for viral attachment to host cells. This protein is highly variable between strains. G protein exists in both membrane-bound and secreted forms. The membrane-found form is responsible for attachment by binding to glycosaminoglycans (GAGs), such as heparan sulfate, on the surface of host cells. The secreted form acts as a decoy, interacting with antigen presenting cells to inhibit antibody-mediated neutralization. G protein also contains a CX3C fractalkine-like motif that binds to the CX3C chemokine receptor 1 (CX3CR1) on the surface of ciliated bronchial host cells. This binding may alter cellular chemotaxis and reduce the migration of immune cells into the lungs of infected individuals. G protein also alters host immune response by inhibiting signaling from several toll-like receptors, including TLR4.

F protein
Surface protein F (fusion protein) is responsible for fusion of viral and host cell membranes, as well as syncytium formation between viral particles. Its sequence is highly conserved between strains. While viral attachment appears to involve both F and G proteins, F fusion occurs independently of G. F protein exists in multiple conformational forms. In the prefusion state (PreF), the protein exists in a trimeric form and contains the major antigenic site Ø. Ø serves as a primary target of neutralizing antibodies in the body. After binding to its target on the host cell surface (its exact ligand remains unclear), PreF undergoes a conformational change during which Ø is lost. This change enables the protein to insert itself into the host cell membrane and leads to fusion of the viral and host cell membranes. A final conformational shift results in a more stable and elongated form of the protein (postfusion, PostF). Opposite of the RSV G protein, the RSV F protein also binds to and activates toll-like receptor 4 (TLR4), initiating the innate immune response and signal transduction.

Replication cycle
Following fusion of the viral and host cell membranes, the viral nucleocapsid (containing the viral genome) and the associated viral polymerase are delivered into the host cell cytoplasm. Transcription and translation both occur within the cytoplasm. RNA-dependent RNA polymerase transcribes the genome into 10 segments of messenger RNA (mRNA) which is translated into structural proteins by host cell machinery. During replication of the negative-sense viral genome, RNA-dependent RNA polymerase synthesizes a positive-sense complement called the antigenome. This complementary strand is used as a template to construct genomic negative-sense RNA, which is packaged into nucleocapsids and transported to the plasma membrane for assembly and particle budding.

Mechanism

Transmission
RSV is highly contagious and can cause outbreaks from both community and hospital transmission. For each person infected with RSV, it is estimated that an average of 5 to 25 uninfected people will become infected. RSV can spread when an infected person coughs or sneezes, releasing contaminated droplets into the air. Transmission usually occurs when these droplets come into contact with another person's eyes, nose, or mouth. RSV can also live for up to 25 minutes on contaminated skin (i.e. hands) and several hours on other surfaces like countertops and doorknobs. It has an incubation period of 2 to 8 days. Once infected, people are usually contagious for 3 to 8 days. In infants and in people with weakened immune systems, however, the virus may continue to spread for up to 4 weeks (even after they are no longer showing symptoms).

Pathogenesis
Following transmission through the nose or eyes, RSV infects ciliated columnar epithelial cells of the upper and lower airway. RSV continues to replicate within these bronchial cells for about 8 days. After the first several days, RSV-infected cells will become more rounded and ultimately slough into the smaller bronchioles of the lower airway. This sloughing mechanism is also thought to be responsible for the spread of virus from the upper to lower respiratory tract. Infection causes generalized inflammation within the lungs, including the migration and infiltration of inflammatory cells (such as monocytes and T-cells), necrosis of the epithelial cell wall, edema, and increased mucous production. Inflammation and cell damage tends to be patchy rather than diffuse. Together, the sloughed epithelial cells, mucous plugs, and accumulated immune cells cause obstruction of the lower airway.

Diagnosis

Laboratory diagnosis
A variety of laboratory tests are available for the diagnosis of RSV infection. While the American Academy of Pediatrics (AAP) does not routinely recommend the use of lab testing to diagnosis RSV bronchiolitis (for which the treatment is largely supportive), confirmation of RSV infection may be warranted in high-risk groups if the result will guide clinical decisions. Common identification techniques include antigen testing, molecular testing, and viral culture.

Antigen testing
Antigen testing involves detection of RSV antigen fragments (or pieces of molecular viral structures), usually from an nasopharyngeal swab or aspirate. This can be accomplished either by viewing fluorescently labeled antigens under a microscope (direct fluorescence assay, or DFA) or using a commercially available rapid antigen detection test (RADT). Overall, antigen testing is highly sensitive in young children (80–90%) but substantially less reliable in older children and adults, who have less viral shedding. Antigen tests are also subject to higher false positive rates outside of the peak RSV season, such as in the summer months. In these scenarios, the use of either viral culture or nucleic acid amplification testing (NAAT) may aid in an accurate RSV diagnosis.
 Rapid antigen detection tests (RADT) are commonly used as point-of-care testing due to their ease of use and quick turnaround time (as little as 10 minutes). These include both enzyme immunosorbent assays (EIA) and chromatographic immunoassays (CIA).
 Direct fluorescence assay (DFA) allows for direct microscopic examination of virus-infected cells. The sensitivity of DFA testing depends on an adequate specimen.

Molecular testing
Molecular assays, such as nucleic acid amplification tests (NAATs), enable sensitive detection of very small amounts of virus in nasopharyngeal swabs and aspirates. NAAT assays such as polymerase chain reaction (PCR) detect virus-specific genetic material, rather than viral antigens. They have a sensitivity and specificity approaching 100%. However, they tend to be more expensive and require more complex equipment than other testing methods, making them less practical in resource limited areas.
 Polymerase chain reaction (PCR) is type of NAAT which allows a very small sample of genetic material to be rapidly amplified into millions of copies for study. PCR is more sensitive than either antigen testing or viral culture. Therefore, it can be used to detect virus in those with lower viral shedding, such as older children and adults. It may also be used to detect the disease earlier in at-risk individuals (such as hospitalized or immunocompromised patients), when the viral burden may still be too low to be identified by traditional techniques. Because of its sensitivity, PCR can also often detect asymptomatic carriers and may remain positive even days after an infection has clinically resolved.
 Multi-pathogen panels are also available, which can detect the presence of multiple viral infections (including RSV) in a single patient.

Viral culture
In traditional viral culture, a sample of the virus is introduced to different cell lines and allowed to replicate so it can be studied. Benefits of this technique include the ability to perform genetic characterization, strain typing, and antiviral susceptibility testing. However, it is limited by its prolonged turnaround time of 3–7 days, making it less common in patient care and more common in research settings.

Serologic testing
Serology (the measurement of virus-specific antibodies in the serum) is not frequently used in RSV diagnosis. The time required for the body to mount a significant serologic response (and demonstrate a significant rise in antibodies that can be detected in serum) is usually not useful in guiding patient care. Up to 30% of patients with documented RSV infection will have negative serology results. As such, this method is generally reserved for research and surveillance studies.

Imaging findings

Chest X-rays findings in children with RSV bronchiolitis are generally nonspecific and include perihilar markings, patchy hyperinflation, and atelectasis. However, the American Academy of Pediatrics (AAP) does not recommend routine imaging for children with presumed RSV bronchiolitis because it does not change clinical outcomes and is associated with increased antibiotic use. Chest X-ray is sometimes considered when the diagnosis of bronchiolitis is unclear or when there is an unexpected worsening. In adults with RSV infection, chest films are often normal or demonstrate nonspecific changes consistent with viral pneumonia, such as patchy bilateral infiltrates.

Differential diagnosis
The differential diagnosis for individuals presenting with signs and symptoms of upper and lower respiratory tract infection includes other viral infections (such as rhinovirus, metapneumovirus, and influenza) and primary bacterial pneumonia. In children, inhaled foreign bodies and congenital conditions such as cystic fibrosis or asthma should also be considered.

Prevention

General prevention measures
The main prevention measure is to avoid close contact with infected individuals. In community and daycare settings, careful hand washing can help reduce transmission. In hospital settings, strict adherence to infection control measures can help prevent the spread of RSV to high-risk individuals. Alcohol-based disinfectants are recommended for hand decontamination.

Immunoprophylaxis

Although there is no vaccine against RSV, passive immunization is available to prevent RSV infection and hospitalization in the highest risk infants. Historically, RSV-specific intravenous immunoglobin (IVIG) was used to provide passive immunity. This involved monthly administration of RSV-neutralizing antibodies (or immunoglobins) from human donors recovering from the disease. While this transfer of antibodies was reasonably effective in providing short-term immunization to at-risk infants, it was limited by both its intravenous administration and cost.

RSV-IVIG has since been replaced with the use of a monoclonal antibody (MAb) that can be delivered through muscular injection. While several monoclonal antibodies have been developed for RSV prophylaxis, the most successful of these has been palivizumab (brand name Synagis). Palivizumab is a monoclonal antibody directed against the surface fusion (F) protein of the RSV virus. It was licensed in 1998 and is effective in providing temporary prophylaxis against both RSV A and B. It is given by monthly injections, which are begun just prior to the RSV season and are usually continued for five months. Palivizumab has been shown to reduce both hospitalization rates and all-cause mortality in certain groups of high-risk children (such as those with chronic lung disease, congenital heart disease, and those born preterm). However, its cost limits its use in many parts of the world. More potent derivatives of this antibody have since been developed (including motavizumab) but were associated with considerable adverse events.

The American Academy of Pediatrics (AAP 2014) recommends RSV prophylaxis with palivizumab during RSV season for:
 Infants born at ≤28 weeks 6 days gestational age and <12 months at the start of RSV season
 Infants <12 months old with chronic lung disease of prematurity
 Infants ≤12 months old with hemodynamically significant congenital heart disease
 Infants <24 months old with chronic lung disease of prematurity requiring medical therapy

Per AAP guidelines, palivizumab prophylaxis may also be considered in infants with:
 Congenital airway abnormality
 Neuromuscular disorder
 Cystic fibrosis
 Severe immunocompromise
 Recent or upcoming heart transplantation

Nirsevimab (Beyfortus) was approved for medical use in the European Union in November 2022.

Vaccines

, there is no licensed vaccine to prevent infection by RSV. There has been tremendous interest and research in RSV vaccine discovery, given the virus's significant disease burden and the relative lack of disease-specific therapies. However, vaccine development has faced significant obstacles that have blocked its progress. Among these are infant-specific factors, such as the immature infant immune system and the presence of maternal antibodies, which make infantile immunization difficult.

Attempts to develop an RSV vaccine began in the 1960s with a formalin-inactivated vaccine that was developed for use in infants and children. While a similar method was used to create a safe and effective poliovirus vaccine, this vaccine resulted in a dangerous phenomenon that came to be known as vaccine-associated enhanced respiratory disease (VAERD). In VAERD, the vaccinated infants went on to develop significantly worse respiratory disease than non-vaccinated infants during subsequent natural infection. Some 80% of such children (vs. 5% of virus-exposed controls) were hospitalized, with two cases leading to death. This disaster led to extreme caution and hindered vaccine development for many years.

A 2019 paper claimed that research toward vaccine development had greatly advanced over the preceding 5–10 years, with more than 30 candidates in some stage of development. The same study predicted that a vaccine would be available within 10 years. The types of vaccines currently in research fall into five broad categories: live-attenuated, protein subunit, vector-based, particle-based, and messenger RNA. Each targets different immune responses, and thus may be better suited to prevent disease in different at-risk groups. Live-attenuated vaccines have shown some success in RSV-naive infants. Other vaccine candidates hope to target vulnerable populations across the lifespan, including pregnant women and the elderly.

Treatment

Supportive care
Treatment for RSV infection is focused primarily on supportive care. This may include monitoring a patient's breathing or using suction to remove secretions from the upper airway. Supplemental oxygen may also be delivered though a nasal cannula or face mask in order to improve airflow. In severe cases of respiratory failure, intubation and mechanical ventilation may be required to support breathing. If signs of dehydration are present, fluids may also be given orally or through an IV.

Additional supportive treatments have been investigated specifically in infants hospitalized with RSV bronchiolitis. These include the following:
 Nebulized hypertonic saline has been shown to reduce length of hospitalization and reduce clinical severity in infants with viral bronchiolitis. A possible mechanism is reducing airway edema and mucus plugging to decrease airway obstruction.
 Heliox, a mixture of oxygen with helium, may improve respiratory distress within the first hour after starting treatment. It works by reducing airway resistance and decreasing the work of breathing. However, it has not been shown to impact overall illness outcomes.
 Chest physiotherapy has not been found to reduce disease severity and is not routinely recommended.
 Inhaled recombinant human deoxyribonuclease (rhDNase), an enzyme that digests the DNA that contributes to mucus plugging and airway obstruction, has not been shown to improve clinical outcomes in this group.

Viral-specific therapies
 Ribavirin is the only antiviral medication currently licensed for the treatment of RSV in children. It is a guanosine analog that acts by inhibiting viral RNA synthesis and capping. It was originally approved in 1986 for treatment of RSV infection. However, the use of ribavirin remains controversial due to unclear evidence regarding efficacy, concerns about toxicity to exposed staff members, as well as cost. As such, most current guidelines do not make specific recommendations regarding its use in children. In adults, ribavirin is used off-label and is generally reserved for the severely immunocompromised, such as those undergoing hematopoietic stem cell transplants.
 Presatovir, an experimental antiviral drug, has shown promising results in clinical trials but has not yet been approved for medical use. It acts as a fusion inhibitor by inhibiting the RSV F protein.
 Immunoglobins, both RSV-specific and non-specific, have historically been used for RSV-related illness. However, there is currently insufficient evidence to support the use of immunoglobins in children with RSV infection.

Anti-inflammatories
 Corticosteroids (systemic or inhaled) have not been found to decrease hospitalization length or disease severity in viral bronchiolitis. Their use may also prolong viral shedding, and thus is not commonly recommended. However, the use of oral corticosteroids remains common in adults with RSV-related exacerbation of underlying lung disease.
 Leukotriene inhibitors such as Montelukast have been used in the treatment of infants and children with bronchiolitis. However, the evidence supporting their use remains inconsistent with no definitive conclusions on their efficacy.

Bronchodilators
Bronchodilators, medications commonly used to treat asthma, are sometimes used to treat the wheezing associated with RSV infection.   These medications (such as albuterol or salbutamol) are beta-agonists that relax the muscles of the airways to allow for improved airflow. However, bronchodilators have not been found to improve clinical severity of infection or rate of hospitalization among those with RSV infection. Given their limited benefit, plus their adverse event profile, they are not routinely recommended for use in RSV bronchiolitis.

Antibiotics
Antibiotic therapy is not appropriate for treatment of RSV-related bronchiolitis or viral pneumonia. Antibiotics target bacterial pathogens, not viral pathogens such as RSV. However, antibiotics may be considered if there is clear evidence that a secondary bacterial infection has developed. Ear infections may also develop in a small number of infants with RSV bronchiolitis, in which case oral antibiotics may sometimes be used.

Epidemiology

Infants and children
Worldwide, RSV is the leading cause of bronchiolitis and pneumonia in infants and children under the age of 5. The risk of serious infection is highest during the first 6 months of life. Of those infected with RSV, 2–3% will develop bronchiolitis, necessitating hospitalization. Each year, approximately 30 million acute respiratory illnesses and over 60,000 childhood deaths are caused by RSV worldwide. An estimated 87% of infants will have experienced an RSV infection by the age of 18 months, and nearly all children will have been infected by 3 years. In the United States, RSV is responsible for up to 20% of acute respiratory infection hospitalizations in children under the age of 5. However, the vast majority of RSV-related deaths occur in low-income countries that lack access to basic supportive care.

Adults
It is rare for healthy young adults to develop severe illness requiring hospitalization from RSV. However, it is now recognized as a significant cause of morbidity and mortality in certain adult populations, including the elderly and those with underlying heart or lung diseases. Its clinical impact among elderly adults is estimated to be similar  to that of influenza. Each year, approximately 5–10% of nursing home residents will experience RSV infection, with significant rates of pneumonia and death. RSV is also responsible for 2–5% of adult community-acquired pneumonias.

Immunocompromised
In both adults and children, immunosuppression increases susceptibility to RSV infection. Children living with HIV are more likely to develop acute illness, and are 3.5 times more likely to require hospitalization than children without HIV. Bone marrow transplant patients prior to marrow engraftment are at particularly high risk, with RSV accounting for nearly half of the viral infections in this population. This group has also demonstrated mortality rates of up to 80% among those with RSV pneumonia. While infection may occur within the community, hospital-acquired infection is thought to account for 30–50% of cases among immunocompromised individuals.

Seasonality
RSV seasonality varies around the world. In temperate climates, infection rates tend to be highest during the cold winter months. This is often attributed to increased indoor crowding and increased viral stability in the lower temperatures. In tropical and arctic climates, however, the annual variation is less well defined and seems to be more prevalent during the rainy season. Annual epidemics are generally caused by the presence of several different viral strains. Subtype A and B viruses will often circulate simultaneously within a specific geographic region, although group A viruses are more prevalent.

COVID-19
Public health measures taken in response to the COVID-19 pandemic resulted in a significant decline in the prevalence of RSV.  There was then a significant unseasonal rebound when lockdowns and other restrictive measures were relaxed. In November 2022, the RSV hospitalization rate for newborns was seven times the rate in 2018. This, combined with increasing influenza circulation caused the US state of Oregon to declare a state of emergency. The Children's Hospital Association and the American Academy of Pediatrics asked US President Joe Biden to declare a state of emergency.

Notes

References

Atypical pneumonias
Viral respiratory tract infections